Joshua Mason (born 19 March 2002) is a British racing driver who is currently racing in the Euroformula Open Championship with CryptoTower Racing.

He is of Caribbean and Nigerian descent, and grew up between Sussex and the Cayman Islands.

Career

Karting 
Mason began competing in karts at the relatively late age of 14, taking part in club racing before moving into car racing.

BRDC British F3

2018 
In 2018, Mason graduated to car racing, driving for Lanan Racing in the BRDC British Formula 3 Championship. Having made his debut at Rockingham, the Brit would return to the series for the second half of the campaign, managing to win the reverse-grid race in the final round at Silverstone after it had been abandoned due to heavy rain following two laps behind the Safety car.

2019 
He stayed at Lanan Racing for the 2019 season, competing as the team's sole full-time entrant. Despite this, Mason would manage to score three podiums in reverse-grid races, including a victory at Donington Park, where he overtook poleman Pavan Ravishankar at the Safety car restart. The Briton ended up twelfth in the standings in a season that, given his lack of overall experience, he described as "having gone well".

2020 
Once again, Mason remained with the same team in 2020, this time racing alongside Piers Prior and Bart Horsten. Having been unable to prepare adequately for the season due to living with a high-risk individual at the height of the COVID-19 pandemic, Mason only scored a sole podium at Donington and finished 16th in the championship, behind both of his teammates.

Euroformula Open

2021 

For 2021, Mason moved to the Euroformula Open Championship, driving for Double R Racing. His best result came at a wet Hungaroring, finishing fourth, as he ended up ninth in the standings, significantly ahead of rookie teammate Zdeněk Chovanec.

2022 
The following year, the Brit made the switch to drive for CryptoTower Racing for the 2022 season, having stated that he had "learned a lot in 2021" and that he was "really looking forward" to linking up with the team. He started out the campaign with three points finishes in Estoril, before a crash during the Pau Grand Prix. Another retirement followed at Paul Ricard, caused by a collision with Alex García, before Mason scored his first podiums in the series at Spa, finishing third in Race 1 and second in Race 3. At the following round, held at the Hungaroring, Mason took his first victory, winning Race 2 in dominant fashion. The positive momentum remained, with Mason winning once more at Imola and Monza respectively. He ended the season fifth in the championship standings, narrowly missing out on fourth to Frederick Lubin.

Formula Regional 
At the start of 2023, Mason joined the 2023 Formula Regional Oceania Championship.

Racing record

Racing career summary 

* Season still in progress.

Complete BRDC British Formula 3 Championship results 
(key) (Races in bold indicate pole position) (Races in italics indicate fastest lap)

Complete Euroformula Open Championship results 
(key) (Races in bold indicate pole position; races in italics indicate points for the fastest lap of top ten finishers)

Complete Formula Regional Oceania Championship Results
(key) (Races in bold indicate pole position) (Races in italics indicate fastest lap)

References

External links 
 
 

Living people
2002 births
British racing drivers
Euroformula Open Championship drivers
MRF Challenge Formula 2000 Championship drivers
BRDC British Formula 3 Championship drivers
Double R Racing drivers
Motopark Academy drivers
Toyota Racing Series drivers